The  Community Capacity Development Office (CCDO) is an office of the United States Department of Justice and a component of the Office of Justice Programs. The mission is to work within local communities to reduce crime and improve the quality of life.

The office oversees the Weed and Seed program which was established in 1991, which works to reduce drug abuse, violent crime and gang activity in high-risk neighborhoods. The Weed aspect of the program is to remove all the negative influences in communities. The Seed portion of the program is to bring in new influences that help promote a better quality of life through rehabilitation programs. The Weed and Seed program is no longer funded but its model is used in different community based programs. There are over 300 Weed and Seed locations across the country.

The CCDO is headed by Dennis E. Greenhouse, formerly County Executive of New Castle County, Delaware.

The International Economic Development Council (IEDC) is an officially designated Weed and Seed technical assistance provider in areas of economic development and neighborhood restoration. Through a grant from the Department of Justice, IEDC helps Weed & Seed communities initiate efforts to bring in new investment and economic opportunities to their neighborhoods. IEDC's assistance is at no cost to the community. 

For a sample of The Weed and Seed Strategy program, please see:

https://www.ncjrs.gov/pdffiles1/207498.pdf

Due to lack of federal funding, the Community Capacity Development Office closed June 5, 2011.

See also
 Indianapolis Weed and Seed
 Far Rockaway Weed and Seed and NPO Grant Consulting's Evaluation Study

External links
  Community Capacity Development Office website

Crime prevention